A list of comedy films released in the 1930s.

References

1930s

Comedy